Apallaga mokeezi, also known as the large sprite, large flat or Christmas forester, is a species of butterfly in the family Hesperiidae. It is found in South Africa (from Transkei to KwaZulu-Natal and Transvaal) and Mozambique. The habitat consists coastal forests and montane forests.

The wingspan is 40–48 mm for males and 45–51 mm for females. Adults are on wing year-round in warmer areas with peaks in late summer and autumn.

The larvae feed on Isoglossa woodii (buckweed).

Subspecies
Apallaga mokeezi mokeezi - South Africa: from eastern Cape to the southern KwaZulu-Natal coast and midlands
Apallaga mokeezi separata (Strand, 1911) - southern Mozambique, Eswatini, South Africa: Limpopo Province, Mpumalanga, KwaZulu-Natal

References

Butterflies described in 1857
mokeezi